The 1993–94 UEFA Cup was won by Internazionale on aggregate over Austria Salzburg. Juventus were the defending champions, but got eliminated in the quarter-finals by Cagliari.

Eastern Europe arrangements
Political revolutions in Eastern Europe imposed some UEFA decisions. Yugoslavia was banned under UN embargo: its places were divided between former USSR, Romania, and former Czechoslovakia. An agreement between UEFA, Russia and Ukraine recognized Russia as heir of the three Soviet places, while Ukraine divided with Slovenia the heritage of disbanded East Germany. Albania was declared unsafe and it was substituted by a third club from Scotland. Poland was disqualified after its football scandal, and its places went to Hungary and Bulgaria.

Note: three clubs entered in the competition for former Czechoslovakia. However, their records and results were awarded to their new countries, Slovakia and the Czech Republic.

First round

|}

First leg

Second leg

Deportivo La Coruña won 1–5 on aggregate.

Bordeaux won 0–6 on aggregate.

Borussia Dortmund won 1–0 on aggregate.

Brøndby IF 3–3 Dundee United on aggregate. Brøndby IF won on away goals rule.

Celtic won 0–1 on aggregate.

Tenerife won 2–3 on aggregate.

Servette won 0–4 on aggregate.

Cagliari won 4–3 on aggregate.

Eintracht Frankfurt won 7–2 on aggregate.

Dnipro Dnipropetrovsk won 4–2 on aggregate.

Kuusysi Lahti won 5–1 on aggregate.

Valencia won 2–4 on aggregate.

Bayern Munich won 7–3 on aggregate.

NK Maribor won 0–2 on aggregate.

Atlético Madrid won 4-2 on aggregate.

Mechelen won 1–2 on aggregate.

Internazionale won 5–1 on aggregate.

Juventus won 4–0 on aggregate.

Karlsruhe won 2–1 on aggregate.

MTK Budapest won 1–2 on aggregate.

Sporting CP won 0–2 on aggregate.

Norwich City won 3–0 on aggregate.

 Kongsvinger won 7–2 on aggregate.

Olympiacos won 8–3 on aggregate.

Royal Antwerp won 4–2 on aggregate.

Austria Salzburg won 4–0 on aggregate.

Lazio won 4–0 on aggregate.

OFI Crete won 1–2 on aggregate.

Aston Villa won 1–2 on aggregate.

Trabzonspor won 6–2 on aggregate.

Boavista won 0–5 on aggregate.

Apollon Limassol won 2–4 on aggregate.

Second round

|}

First leg

Second leg

OFI Crete won 1–2 on aggregate.

Norwich City won 3–2 on aggregate.

Olympiacos 5–5 Tenerife. Tenerife won on away goals rule.

Sporting CP won 2–1 on aggregate.

Deportivo de La Coruña won 1–2 on aggregate.

Eintracht Frankfurt won 2–1 on aggregate.

Bordeaux won 3–1 on aggregate.

Brøndby IF won 7–2 on aggregate.

Internazionale won 4–3 on aggregate.

Juventus won 3–1 on aggregate.

Borussia Dortmund won 2–1 on aggregate.

Austria Salzburg won 2–0 on aggregate.

Boavista won 2–1 on aggregate.

Cagliari 1–1 Trabzonspor on aggregate. Cagliari won on away goals rule.

Karlsruhe won 8–3 on aggregate.

Mechelen won 6–1 on aggregate.

Third round

|}

First leg

Second leg

Borussia Dortmund won 2–1 on aggregate.

Eintracht Frankfurt won 2–0 on aggregate.

Karlsruhe won 3–1 on aggregate.

Juventus won 4–2 on aggregate.

Internazionale won 2–0 on aggregate.

Boavista won 1–6 on aggregate.

Austria Salzburg won 3–2 on aggregate.

Cagliari won 5–1 on aggregate.

Quarter-finals

|}

First leg

Second leg

Karlsruhe won 2–1 on aggregate.

Internazionale won 4–3 on aggregate.

Cagliari won 3–1 on aggregate.

Eintracht Frankfurt 1–1 Austria Salzburg on aggregate. Austria Salzburg won 5–4 in penalty shootout.

Semi-finals

|}

First leg

Second leg

Internazionale won 5–3 on aggregate.

Karlsruhe 1–1 Salzburg on aggregate. Salzburg won on away goals rule

Final

First leg

Second leg

Internazionale won 2–0 on aggregate

Top goalscorers
The top scorers from the 1993–94 UEFA Cup are as follows:

See also
 1993–94 UEFA Champions League

References

External links
1993–94 All matches UEFA Cup – season at UEFA website
Official Site
Results at RSSSF.com
 All scorers 1993–94 UEFA Cup according to protocols UEFA
1993/94 UEFA Cup – results and line-ups (archive)

 
UEFA Cup seasons
2